NCAA Season 82 is the 2006–07 season of the National Collegiate Athletic Association (Philippines).

The start of the basketball competition is scheduled at June 24 at the Araneta Coliseum.

De La Salle-College of Saint Benilde is the host of the 2006–07 season, with this year's theme “Proud and True at 82: Blazing Beyond Limits.”

Basketball

Seniors' tournament

Elimination round

NBI agents were present in the Ninoy Aquino Stadium, monitoring the basketball games. Rumours still persist that there were still efforts of game fixing in the games. The suspects "resurfaced" during the first round game between the Blazers and the Heavy Bombers, the day where the agents were supposedly absent.

Bracket

Awards

Samuel Ekwe got four out of five awards given by the NCAA Press Corps:
 Most Valuable Player:  Samuel Ekwe (San Beda)
 Most Valuable Player (Finals):  Yousif Aljamal (San Beda)
 Rookie of the Year:  Samuel Ekwe (San Beda)

Juniors' tournament

Elimination round

Bracket

Awards

Elvin Jake Pascual won the MVP award in the Juniors' division, although it was later returned after the conclusion of PCU High School's eligibility scandal.
 Most Valuable Player:  Elvin Pascual (PCU) (returned)
 Rookie of the Year:  Elvin Pascual (PCU) (returned)

Volleyball tournaments
Seniors' Division:
Men's tournament: PCU Dolphins def. Letran Knights
Most Outstanding Player: Eric John O. Genil (PCU)
Coach of the Year: Gilbert L. Ordon (PCU)
Women's tournament: San Sebastian Lady Stags def. Letran Lady Knights
Most Outstanding Player: Joy H. Pulido (SSC-R)
Coach of the Year: Rogelio G. Gorayeb (SSC-R)
Juniors' Division: San Sebastian Staglets def. UPHSD Altalettes
Most Outstanding Player: Nelson P. Rivera, Jr. (SSC-R)
Coach of the Year: Rogelio G. Gorayeb (SSC-R)

Swimming tournaments

Seniors' division

Juniors' division

Chess tournaments

Seniors' division

Juniors' division

Individual awards
Most outstanding players:
Juniors': Haridas Pascua (PCU)
Seniors': Deniel Causo (PCU)
Coach of the year: Raymond Salcedo (PCU)

Cheerdance competition
The NCAA Cheerdance Competition was held on September 8, 2006 at the Araneta Coliseum. The UPHSD PerpSquad successfully defended their championship, while the Letran Cheering Squad and the Mapúa Cheerping Cardinals all improved their places as compared from last year.

The Cheerdance Competition is not counted on the tabulation of the General Championship.

General Championship

Seniors division

Broadcast notes
ABS-CBN affiliates Studio 23 and The Filipino Channel broadcast the Playoffs series and selected elimination round games. The broadcast crew included Butch Maniego and Bill Velasco, among others.  The broadcast crew included the courtside reporters from all schools.

See also
 UAAP Season 69

References

External links
 Official NCAA website

2006 in Philippine sport
2007 in Philippine sport
2006 in multi-sport events
2007 in multi-sport events
82